Kim Rak-hui (11 November 1933 – February 2013) was a North Korean politician. Kim worked in the agricultural and cooperatives section for most of her working life. During the Korean War, her efforts in rationing caught the attention of Kim Il-sung. Many time delegate to the Supreme People's Assembly (SPA), Kim Rak-hui rose in the ranks of the Workers' Party of Korea (WPK), becoming a full member of its Central Committee in 1970. She was appointed to the Politburo of the Workers' Party of Korea in 2010 and became one of six Vice Premiers of North Korea that year. She ran a committee to combat epizootic diseases.

In 2012, her career started to decline as she was stripped of her Politburo membership and Vice-Premiership. Initially, it was speculated that she was caught up in personnel changes to consolidate the rule of Kim Jong-un. After it was announced that Kim Rak-hui had died in February 2013, the decline of her career was attributed to ill-health instead. Through her career, Kim was awarded Hero of Labor, Order of Kim Il-sung, Order of Kim Jong-il, and Order of the National Flag (first class).

Early life
Kim Rak-hui was born in Kaechon, South Pyongan Province on 11 November 1933. Before her career, she graduated from the University of National Economics.

Career
Most of Kim's career was spent in agricultural cooperatives and rural management committees. During the Korean War, she supervised food rationing and distribution. Her efforts caught the attention of the country's leader, Kim Il-sung. After the war, she became the general manager of Ponghwa Agricultural Cooperatives in South Pyongan Province in August 1953. In the aftermath of the war, she drove rebuilding efforts on farms of the Kaechon area, for which she was awarded the title Hero of Labor in 1955. She became the chairwoman of Kaechon Ponghwa Agricultural Cooperatives in September 1962.

Kim was elected a member of parliament to the Second Supreme People's Assembly (SPA) in 1957. She renewed her seat for the Third (1962), Fourth (1967), and Fifth SPAs (1972), after which she lost it until returning for the Ninth (1990), 11th (2003) and 12th SPAs.

In November 1970 Kim became a member of the Central Committee of the Workers' Party of Korea (WPK) at the Fifth WPK Congress. She was demoted to alternate member in October 1980 at the Sixth Party Congress. In November 1984 Kim become the municipal chairwoman of Kaesong. In April 1990 Kim was appointed the chairwoman of the South Pyongan Province Rural Managerial Committee. She was dismissed from her post in September 1997. That year she was made vice director of the WPK Agriculture Department, but continued to be an advisor to the South Pyongan committee. In June 2005 she became Chief Secretary of the South Hwanghae Provincial WPK Committee.

Kim was appointed to the Politburo of the Workers' Party of Korea in 2010 at its Third Conference, ranking 27th in the unofficial party hierarchy. Kim was appointed one of six Vice Premiers of North Korea in the third session of the 12th SPA on 7 June 2010. Her appointment was part of a reshuffle to elevate several provincial politicians to important posts in the Cabinet of North Korea. During her Vice-Premiership, she made multiple public appearances and ran a Cabinet committee to prevent the outbreak of epizootic diseases like the foot-and-mouth disease. The Cabinet also conferred on her the title of its honorary councilor.

After Kim Il-sung died in 1994, Kim Rak-hui was on his funeral committee. She was on a similar committee of O Jin-u the following year. She was number 24 on the committee of Jo Myong-rok. In 2011, she appeared on the committee for the funeral of Kim Jong-il, ranked 21 highest.

Decline and death
Kim was last seen in public in early March 2012 at an International Women's Day event. By the course of the year, the 5th session of the 12th SPA in April removed her from the office of Vice Premier, and the 4th Conference of the Workers' Party of Korea removed her from the Politburo. It was speculated that the decline of her career was due to efforts to consolidate the rule of Kim Jong-un by personnel changes. For instance, North Korea expert Alexandre Mansourov counted her among "holdovers who failed to secure Kim's trust or demonstrate their value". After North Korean media reported on 18 February 2013 that Kim Rak-hui had died, her demotions were attributed to health issues instead. Kim Jong-un sent a floral basket to her funeral. During her life, she had been awarded, in addition to Labor of Hero, the following: Order of Kim Il-sung, Order of Kim Jong-il, and Order of the National Flag (first class).

See also

 Politics of North Korea
 Women in North Korea

References

Works cited

Date of death missing
Place of death missing
1933 births
2013 deaths
20th-century North Korean women politicians
20th-century North Korean politicians
People from South Pyongan
Government ministers of North Korea
Recipients of the Order of Kim Il-sung
Recipients of the Order of Kim Jong-il
Alternate members of the 6th Politburo of the Workers' Party of Korea
Members of the 5th Central Committee of the Workers' Party of Korea
Members of the 6th Central Committee of the Workers' Party of Korea
Members of the 2nd Supreme People's Assembly
Members of the 3rd Supreme People's Assembly
Members of the 4th Supreme People's Assembly
Members of the 5th Supreme People's Assembly
Members of the 9th Supreme People's Assembly
Members of the 11th Supreme People's Assembly
Members of the 12th Supreme People's Assembly
21st-century North Korean women politicians
21st-century North Korean politicians
Women government ministers of North Korea